Hiltonia can refer to:
Hiltonia, Georgia
Hiltonia, Trenton, New Jersey